The following lists events that happened during 1892 in Australia.

Incumbents

Premiers
Premier of New South Wales – George Dibbs
Premier of South Australia – Thomas Playford II (until 21 June), Frederick Holder (until 15 October), then John Downer
Premier of Queensland – Samuel Griffith
Premier of Tasmania – Philip Fysh (until 17 August) then Henry Dobson
Premier of Western Australia – John Forrest
Premier of Victoria – James Munro (until 16 February), then William Shiels

Governors
Governor of New South Wales – Victor Child Villiers, 7th Earl of Jersey  
Governor of Queensland – Henry Wylie Norman 
Governor of South Australia – Algernon Keith-Falconer, 9th Earl of Kintore 
Governor of Tasmania – Robert Hamilton until 30 November, vacant thereafter
Governor of Victoria – John Hope, 1st Marquess of Linlithgow 
Governor of Western Australia – William C. F. Robinson

Events
 20 April – Victoria holds a general election.
 23 May – Frederick Deeming hanged at Melbourne Gaol having been unsuccessfully defended by the lawyer Alfred Deakin. Deeming was accused of committing a series of crimes on three continents – theft, perjury, fraud, bigamy and murder; he used at least 20 aliases.
 10 October – Jackie Howe shears a total of 321 sheep in 7 hours and 40 minutes at Blackall, Queensland, a record for hand shears that still stands.

 1 January – Physical Culture (Physie) started in Australia.

Arts and literature

Sport
 5 October – the Australian Cricket Council announces an intercolonial cricket competition to be known as the Sheffield Shield.
 Glenloth wins the Melbourne Cup
 Collingwood Football Club was founded

Births
 13 April – Gladys Moncrieff (died 1976), singer
 20 April – Grace Cossington Smith, (died 1984), artist
 6 July – John Simpson Kirkpatrick (died 1915), World War I ANZAC known as "the man with the donkey" 
 7 August – Sir Arthur Coles (died 1982), businessman and philanthropist
 8 December – Bert Hinkler (died 1933), aviator

Deaths

 10 May – Barcroft Boake (born 1866), poet
 7 November – John Morphett (born 1809), explorer, settler and politician

References

 
Years of the 19th century in Australia